The Roman Catholic Diocese of Luz is a diocese located in the city of Luz in the ecclesiastical province of Belo Horizonte in Brazil.

History
 July 18, 1918: Established as Diocese of Aterrado from the Metropolitan Archdiocese of Mariana and Diocese of Uberaba
 December 5, 1960: Renamed as Diocese of Luz

Bishops
 Bishops of Luz (Roman rite), in reverse chronological order
 Bishop José Aristeu Vieira (2015.02.25 - )
 Bishop Antonio Carlos Félix (2003.02.05 – 2014.03.06), appointed Bishop of Governador Valadares, Minas Gerais
 Bishop Eurico dos Santos Veloso (1994.05.18 – 2001.11.28), appointed Archbishop of Juiz de Fora, Minas Gerais
 Bishop Belchior Joaquim da Silva Neto, C.M. (1967.07.09 – 1994.05.18)
 Bishop Manoel Nunes Coelho (1960.12.05 – 1967.07.08)
 Bishops of Aterrado (Roman Rite)
 Bishop Manoel Nunes Coelho (1920.06.10 – 1960.12.05)

Coadjutor bishops
Belchior Joaquim da Silva Neto, C.M. † (1960-1967)
Eurico dos Santos Veloso (1991-2004)

References

Sources
 GCatholic.org
 Catholic Hierarchy
  Diocese website 

Roman Catholic dioceses in Brazil
Christian organizations established in 1918
Luz, Roman Catholic Diocese of
Roman Catholic dioceses and prelatures established in the 20th century